Quints is a 2000 Disney Channel Original Movie starring Kimberly J. Brown as the older sister of a set of quintuplets.

One of the quints was played by Kimberly J. Brown’s real-life brother Dylan Brown.

Plot summary 
Fourteen-year-old Jamie Grover (Kimberly J. Brown) is an only child who resents the constant attention her parents give her. Her wish for less attention is finally granted when her mother becomes pregnant. However, her mother gives birth to quintuplets and Jamie's life changes dramatically and she begins to resent her new siblings. She also discovers she might not want the same things for herself that her parents want for her. Because of the demands of having five babies in the house, her parents focus all of their attention on the quints: Adam, Becky, Charlie, Debbie, and Eddie.

Jamie's parents hire a babysitter named Fiona to help take care of the quints, although she later resigns due to exhaustion. To help cover costs, Jamie's parents agree to let their babies star in a diaper commercial. Albert, a representative for the diaper company, works with Jamie's parents to devise ways to keep the quints popular. Jamie reluctantly joins her school's art class, taught by Mr. Blackmer (James Kall), and discovers that she enjoys it. When Adam becomes ill, Jamie discovers that she really does not mind the babies and that she does have the courage to let her parents know she has dreams of her own. Jamie's parents fire Albert after he suggests replacing Adam with a look-alike baby for an upcoming event. Adam recovers, and Jamie becomes upset when her parents forget about her art being displayed in the school's art show; they attend a dinner with the governor instead, but visit the school later after remembering the art show and she wins the blue ribbon.

At the very end of the movie, she jokes that her mom is now pregnant again with septuplets.

Cast
 Kimberly J. Brown as Jamie Grover
 Daniel Roebuck as Jim Grover
 Elizabeth Morehead as Nancy Grover
 Shadia Simmons as Zoe
 Jake Epstein as Brad
 Robin Duke as Fiona
 Don Knotts as The Governor
 Vince Corazza as Albert
 James Kall as Mr. Blackmer
 Joseph Motiki as Cameraman
 	
*Billed as 'Daniel Roebuck' in opening credits, and as 'Dan Roebuck' in closing credits.

References

External links 
 

Disney Channel Original Movie films
American television films
2000 television films
2000 films
Films directed by Bill Corcoran
Films scored by Michael Tavera
American pregnancy films
2000s pregnancy films
Films set in New York (state)
Films shot in Toronto
2000s American films